Beami (Bedamini, Bedamuni, Mougulu) is a Papuan language of Papua New Guinea. Komofio is a dialect.

External links 
 Paradisec archive collection of open access Beami recordings.

References 

Bosavi languages
Languages of Southern Highlands Province
Languages of Western Province (Papua New Guinea)